Theatricals: Second Series is a book of two plays by Henry James published in 1895. As a follow-up to his 1894 book Theatricals, James included two more unproduced plays in this volume, The Album and The Reprobate. James wrote a longer preface for this book, where he discussed writing for the theater and the sacrifices involved.

Plot summaries

The Album opens at the country house of Courtland outside London, where the owner Bedford is dying upstairs and the fate of his estate is unclear. Sir Ralph Damant appears on the scene; he's the nearest heir so he figures the estate should be his. Artist Mark Bernal (long lost and thought dead) also shows up. He's a distant relative and comes with an album of sketches dated "September, '91." Three women are already hanging around: Lady Basset, Bedford's buddy who now wants Sir Ralph so she can get the Bedford estate; Maud Vincent, beloved by Teddy Ashdown but wanting more; and Grace Jesmond, Bedford's put-upon secretary who falls for Mark.

An incredible amount of stage bustle ensues, much of it revolving around that album of Mark's. Eventually, Mark and Grace decide to get married, as do Teddy and Maud. Sir Ralph wants to get rid of the fortune-hunting Lady Basset, so in a fit of generosity that closes the play, he gives the Bedford inheritance to Mark.

The Reprobate, a play which James described as better than The Album, opens with an unannounced stranger, Mrs. Freshville, appearing at Mr. Bonsor's Hampton Court villa. It develops that she is Nina, Paul Doubleday's lady friend, who spent time with him in Paris many years ago. For the past decade Paul has been kept under close control in the villa, well away from life's temptations, by his widowed stepmother Mrs. Doubleday and his co-guardian, the bachelor Bonsor.

Blanche Amber, Bonsor's niece, meets Paul and dislikes how he is being treated almost as a child because others suspect him of a dissolute and unreliable nature. Meanwhile, Captain Chanter is pursuing Mrs. Doubleday. After many trials, tribulations, entrances, and exits, Blanche accepts Paul's marriage proposal, which gets him out of his isolation. The "reprobate" Paul turns out to be mature and responsible. To make the ending even happier, Mrs. Doubleday embraces Chanter.

Key themes
If there's any genuine interest in these plays, it resides in the character of Paul Doubleday, the heir to a large fortune who has been kept in virtual isolation because others fear what he might do if he enjoyed complete freedom. Paul is based on Henry Wykoff, a distant relative of James who was kept in much the same kind of isolation, as described in the novelist's autobiographical book, A Small Boy and Others.

The twist is that both the real Wykoff and the fictional Doubleday turn out to be much more dependable and reliable than anybody had thought. This idea might have made for an intriguing psychological narrative by James, but instead he wasted it in the mediocre farce of The Reprobate. There are few if any themes that can be extracted from The Album, except that constant stage bustle can be painfully unfunny.

Critical evaluation
In his introduction, which is probably the most interesting thing in the book, James wrote that these plays were designed to be mostly mindless: "a short comedy, the broader the better, thoroughly simple, intensely pleasant, affording a liberal chance to a young sympathetic comedian, calling for as little acting as possible besides, skirting the fairy-tale, straining any and every point for the agreeable falsity, entailing no expense in mounting, and supremely susceptible of being played to audiences unaccustomed to beating around the bush for their amusement—audiences, to be perfectly honest, in country towns."

Henry James was not the sort of writer who could produce a masterpiece, or even acceptable fluff, under these constraints. As mentioned before, the figure of Paul Doubleday—suspected of irresponsibility but in fact thoroughly dependable—might have made for a clever James short story. But when such a character gets ground into a farce meant to be brainless entertainment, any real interest he might have generated disappears.

By the way, The Reprobate did receive a few performances after James' death. The reviews were mixed. The Times critic liked it: "a plain tale in plain language, an action all bustle and snap, characters all the broadest, drollest caricatures." But Arnold Bennett gave the usual verdict on James in his playwriting efforts: "an unusually able and gifted man trying to so something for which his talents were utterly unfitted."

References
 The Complete Plays of Henry James edited by Leon Edel (New York: Oxford University Press 1990) 

Plays by Henry James
1894 plays